The 2013 Challenger Banque Nationale de Saguenay was a professional tennis tournament played on indoor hard courts. It was the 8th edition of the tournament and part of the 2013 ITF Women's Circuit, offering a total of $50,000 in prize money. It took place in Saguenay, Quebec, Canada between October 21 and October 27, 2013.

Singles main-draw entrants

Seeds

1 Rankings are as of October 14, 2013

Other entrants
The following players received wildcards into the singles main draw:
 Françoise Abanda
 Marie-Alexandre Leduc
 Sonja Molnar
 Jillian O'Neill

The following players received entry from the qualifying draw:
 Élisabeth Fournier
 Tori Kinard
 Lena Litvak
 Caitlin Whoriskey

Champions

Singles

 Ons Jabeur def.  CoCo Vandeweghe, 6–7(0–7), 6–3, 6–3

Doubles

 Marta Domachowska /  Andrea Hlaváčková def.  Françoise Abanda /  Victoria Duval, 7–5, 6–3

External links 
Official website

Challenger Banque Nationale de Saguenay
Challenger de Saguenay
Challenger Banque Nationale de Saguenay